In number theory, Waring's problem asks whether each natural number k has an associated positive integer s such that every natural number is the sum of at most s natural numbers raised to the power k. For example, every natural number is the sum of at most 4 squares, 9 cubes, or 19 fourth powers. Waring's problem was proposed in 1770 by Edward Waring, after whom it is named. Its affirmative answer, known as the Hilbert–Waring theorem, was provided by Hilbert in 1909. Waring's problem has its own Mathematics Subject Classification, 11P05, "Waring's problem and variants".

Relationship with Lagrange's four-square theorem
Long before Waring posed his problem, Diophantus had asked whether every positive integer could be represented as the sum of four perfect squares greater than or equal to zero. This question later became known as Bachet's conjecture, after the 1621 translation of Diophantus by Claude Gaspard Bachet de Méziriac, and it was solved by Joseph-Louis Lagrange in his four-square theorem in 1770, the same year Waring made his conjecture. Waring sought to generalize this problem by trying to represent all positive integers as the sum of cubes, integers to the fourth power, and so forth, to show that any positive integer may be represented as the sum of other integers raised to a specific exponent, and that there was always a maximum number of integers raised to a certain exponent required to represent all positive integers in this way.

The number g(k)
For every , let  denote the minimum number  of th powers of naturals needed to represent all positive integers. Every positive integer is the sum of one first power, itself, so . Waring conjectured that these lower bounds were in fact exact values.

Lagrange's four-square theorem of 1770 states that every natural number is the sum of at most four squares. Since three squares are not enough, this theorem establishes . Lagrange's four-square theorem was conjectured in Bachet's 1621 edition of Diophantus's Arithmetica; Fermat claimed to have a proof, but did not publish it.

Over the years various bounds were established, using increasingly sophisticated and complex proof techniques. For example, Liouville showed that  is at most 53. Hardy and Littlewood showed that all sufficiently large numbers are the sum of at most 19 fourth powers.

Let  and  respectively denote the integral and fractional part of a positive real number . Given the number , only  and  can be used to represent ; the most economical representation requires 
This was noted by J. A. Euler, the son of Leonhard Euler, in about 1772. Later work by Dickson, Pillai, Rubugunday, Niven and many others has proved that

 

Mahler proved that there can only be a finite number of such , and Kubina and Wunderlich have shown that any such  must satisfy . Thus it is conjectured that this never happens, that is,  for every positive integer .

 1, 4, 9, 19, 37, 73, 143, 279, 548, 1079, 2132, 4223, 8384, 16673, 33203, 66190, 132055, 263619, 526502, 1051899, ... .

The number G(k)
From the work of Hardy and Littlewood, the related quantity G(k) was studied with g(k).  G(k) is defined to be the least positive integer s such that every sufficiently large integer (i.e. every integer greater than some constant) can be represented as a sum of at most s positive integers to the power of k. Clearly, G(1) = 1. Since squares are congruent to 0, 1, or 4 (mod 8), no integer congruent to 7 (mod 8) can be represented as a sum of three squares, implying that . Since  for all k, this shows that . Davenport showed that  in 1939, by demonstrating that any sufficiently large number congruent to 1 through 14 mod 16 could be written as a sum of 14 fourth powers (Vaughan in 1985 and 1989 reduced the 14 successively to 13 and 12). The exact value of G(k) is unknown for any other k, but there exist bounds.

Lower bounds for G(k)

The number G(k) is greater than or equal to
 {|
| 2r+2 || if k = 2r with r ≥ 2, or k = 3 × 2r;
|-
| pr+1 || if p is a prime greater than 2 and k = pr(p − 1);
|-
| (pr+1 − 1)/2   || if p is a prime greater than 2 and k = pr(p − 1)/2;
|-
| k + 1 || for all integers k greater than 1.
|}

In the absence of congruence restrictions, a density argument suggests that G(k) should equal .

Upper bounds for G(k)

The upper bound  is due to Linnik in 1943.

Numbers of the form 31·16n always require 16 fourth powers.

Using his improved Hardy-Littlewood method, I. M. Vinogradov published numerous refinements leading to
 
in 1947 and, ultimately,
 
for an unspecified constant C and sufficiently large k in 1959.

Applying his p-adic form of the Hardy–Littlewood–Ramanujan–Vinogradov method to estimating trigonometric sums, in which the summation is taken over numbers with small prime divisors, Anatolii Alexeevitch Karatsuba obtained (1985) a new estimate of the Hardy function  (for ):

 

Further refinements were obtained by Vaughan in 1989.

Wooley then established that for some constant C,
 

Vaughan and Wooley have written a comprehensive survey article.

See also
 Fermat polygonal number theorem, that every positive integer is a sum of at most n of the n-gonal numbers
 Waring–Goldbach problem, the problem of representing numbers as sums of powers of primes
 Subset sum problem, an algorithmic problem that can be used to find the shortest representation of a given number as a sum of powers
 Sums of three cubes, discusses what numbers are the sum of three not necessarily positive cubes
 Sums of four cubes problem, discusses whether every rational integer is the sum of four cubes of rational integers

Notes

References
  G. I. Arkhipov, V. N. Chubarikov, A. A. Karatsuba, "Trigonometric sums in number theory and analysis". Berlin–New-York: Walter de Gruyter, (2004).
 G. I. Arkhipov, A. A. Karatsuba, V. N. Chubarikov, "Theory of multiple trigonometric sums". Moscow: Nauka, (1987).
 Yu. V. Linnik, "An elementary solution of the problem of Waring by Schnirelman's method". Mat. Sb., N. Ser. 12 (54), 225–230 (1943).
 R. C. Vaughan, "A new iterative method in Waring's problem". Acta Mathematica (162), 1–71 (1989).
 I. M. Vinogradov, "The method of trigonometrical sums in the theory of numbers". Trav. Inst. Math. Stekloff (23), 109 pp. (1947).
 I. M. Vinogradov, "On an upper bound for G(n)". Izv. Akad. Nauk SSSR Ser. Mat. (23), 637–642 (1959).
 I. M. Vinogradov, A. A. Karatsuba, "The method of trigonometric sums in number theory", Proc. Steklov Inst. Math., 168, 3–30 (1986); translation from Trudy Mat. Inst. Steklova, 168, 4–30 (1984).
  Survey, contains the precise formula for G(k), a simplified version of Hilbert's proof and a wealth of references.
  Has an elementary proof of the existence of G(k) using Schnirelmann density.
  Has proofs of Lagrange's theorem, the polygonal number theorem, Hilbert's proof of Waring's conjecture and the Hardy–Littlewood proof of the asymptotic formula for the number of ways to represent N as the sum of s kth powers.
 Hans Rademacher and Otto Toeplitz, The Enjoyment of Mathematics (1933). Has a proof of the Lagrange theorem, accessible to high-school students.

External links

 

Additive number theory
Mathematical problems
Unsolved problems in number theory
Squares in number theory